Aspathrekaval  is a village in the southern state of Karnataka, India. It is located in the Hunsur taluk of Mysore district.

Demographics
 India census, Aspathrekaval had a population of 5090 with 2561 males and 2529 females.

See also
 Mysore
 Districts of Karnataka

References

External links

Villages in Mysore district